Macarena Carolina Ripamonti Serrano (born 11 July 1991) is a Chilean politician. She is the mayor of Viña del Mar.

Political positions 
She endorsed Gabriel Boric in the 2021 Chilean general election.

References 

Living people
1991 births
Mayors of Viña del Mar
Women mayors of places in Chile
21st-century Chilean women politicians
Democratic Revolution politicians
University of Valparaíso alumni
Viña del Mar University alumni